The  (CONABIO) is a permanent inter-ministerial commission of the Federal Mexican government, created in 1992. It has the primary purpose of coordinating, supporting and executing activities and projects designed to foment understanding of biodiversity within Mexico and the surrounding region. As a governmental agency, CONABIO produces and collates biodiversity data and assessments across Mexico's varied ecosystems. It also either administers or guides a range of biological conservation and sustainability projects with the intention of securing benefits to Mexican society as a whole.

The mission of CONABIO is to promote, coordinate, support and carry out activities aimed at increasing awareness of biodiversity and its conservation and sustainable use for the benefit of society. Conabio was conceived as an applied research organization, sponsoring basic research that generates and compiles information regarding biodiversity, developing capacity in the area of biodiversity informatics, and to act as a publicly accessible source of information and knowledge.

CONABIO is an institution that generates information on natural capital.

Among the main functions of CONABIO are to implement and operate the National Information System on Biodiversity, as required by article 80, section V of the General Law of Ecological Equilibrium and Environmental Protection. CONABIO provides data, information and advice to various users and implements the national and global biodiversity information networks, complying with international commitments on biodiversity entered into by Mexico, and carries out actions directed towards conservation and sustainable use of biodiversity in Mexico.

The President of the commission is the head of the Federal Executive, C. Andrés Manuel López Obrador. The Technical Secretary is the head of the Secretariat of Environment and Natural Resources, C. Víctor Manuel Toledo and the heads of the following secretariats also participate: Agriculture, Livestock, Rural Development, Fisheries and Food; Social Development; Economy; Public Education; Energy; Finance and Public Credit; Foreign Affairs; Health; and Tourism.

CONABIO performs its functions via an operative group that, since its inception, has been led by José Sarukhán Kermez as National Coordinator.

External links
 CONABIO, official website 
 BIODIVERSIDAD MEXICANA, official website about biodiversity 
 José Sarukhán Kermez on Spanish language Wikipedia
  CONABIO Dos décadas de historia. 1992–2012.
  CONABIO. Intelligence for taking decisions about biodiversity

Biodiversity
Government of Mexico